White Bridge or Bridge of love, is a bridge in Vranje, over the Vranje river, in southeastern Serbia. It is in the old quarters of the city, in the Devet Jugovića Street. 
It was constructed with white stone and dates from 1844, during the Ottoman administration, and is one of the main symbols of Vranje. The bridge is also featured on the city coat of arms.

History 
Legend holds that the bridge was built in memory of the unhappy love between Aisha, a Turkish (Muslim) girl, and Stojan, a Serbian (Christian) shepherd. The daughter of Selim Pasha, an Ottoman governor in Vranje, Aisha fell in love with Stojan, and one day, when they met by the river (deemed haram), Selim saw them. Selim then tried to kill Stojan but accidentally killed his own daughter while she protected Stojan with her body. Stojan then killed himself.

There is a marble plaque on the bridge which reads: 

Due to its deteriorating condition, general reconstruction occurred in 2006.

See also

Tourism in Serbia
Prohor Pčinjski Monastery
Vranjska Banja

References

Sources

External links
 Sights of Vranje, on Vranje Tourist Organization Web site
 CRNI DANI ZA BELI MOST 

Vranje
Ottoman bridges in Serbia
Bridges in Serbia
19th-century establishments in Serbia
Buildings and structures completed in 1844